This event was held on February 2, 2013 as part of the 2013 UCI Cyclo-cross World Championships. Mike Teunissen won the race after a strong last lap, leaving Wietse Bosmans, the pre-race favourite, stuck on a second spot. First year U23, Wout Van Aert, managed to impress by grabbing the third spot on the podium.

Results

References

Men's under-23 race
UCI Cyclo-cross World Championships – Men's under-23 race
UCI Cyclo, Men's Under